Dr. Chelikani Venkata Rama Rao (15 July 1901 – 25 September 1985) was a Communist leader and Member of Indian Parliament.

He is son of Shri Narayana Swamy and born at Kondevaram, East Godavari district on 15 July 1901.  He was educated at R. Ch. High School, Pithapuram and P. R. College, Kakinada. He was graduated from Osmania Medical College, Hyderabad. He married Dr. Ch. Kamalamma in 1934. They had one son, Dr. Stalin.

He was elected to the 1st Lok Sabha from Kakinada (Lok Sabha constituency) in 1952 as a member of Communist Party of India.

He died on 25 September 1985 at Ramachandrapuram.

External links
 Biodata of Chelikani Venkata Rama Rao at Lok Sabha website.

Telugu politicians
India MPs 1952–1957
1901 births
1985 deaths
Lok Sabha members from Andhra Pradesh
People from East Godavari district
Communist Party of India politicians from Andhra Pradesh